Sasa Zivoulovic (14 April 1972 – 9 February 2023) was a Serbian-Greek handball player. He competed in the men's tournament at the 2004 Summer Olympics.

References

External links

1972 births
2023 deaths
Greek male handball players
Serbian emigrants to Greece
Olympic handball players of Greece
Handball players at the 2004 Summer Olympics
People from Zaječar